The Kings Kids is an American Christian punk band that primarily plays punk rock. Hailing from Salinas, California, the band started making music in 2005, and released Set Sail and Seek…, a studio album, in 2011.

Background
The Kings Kids is a Christian punk band from Salinas, California. Their members are vocalist, Jason Martinez, guitarist, Josh Galvan, bassist, Lupe Gutierrez, and drummer, Milo Zavala.

Music history
The band commenced as a musical entity in 2005, with their first release, Set Sail and Seek…, that was released on November 5, 2011, with Thumper Punk Records.

Members
Current members
 Jason Martinez - lead vocals
 Josh Galvan - lead guitar
 Lupe Gutierrez - bass
 Mark Zavala - drums

Discography
Studio albums
 Urgency (June 8, 2008, Self Released)
 Set, Sail and Seek… (November 5, 2011, Thumper Punk)

References

External links
Official website

Musical groups from California
2005 establishments in California
Musical groups established in 2005